Dewell Lerome Brewer (born May 22, 1970) is a former American football running back who played one season with the Indianapolis Colts of the National Football League. He played college football at the University of Oklahoma and attended Lawton High School in Lawton, Oklahoma. He was also a member of the Carolina Panthers.

References

External links
Just Sports Stats
SoonerStats.com

Living people
1970 births
Players of American football from Oklahoma
American football running backs
American football return specialists
African-American players of American football
Oklahoma Sooners football players
Indianapolis Colts players
Sportspeople from Lawton, Oklahoma
21st-century African-American sportspeople
20th-century African-American sportspeople